Santiago Donovan Guzmán (born July 25, 1949) is a retired Dominican professional baseball player, a right-handed pitcher who appeared in 12 Major League games for the St. Louis Cardinals from 1969–1972.

Guzmán broke into pro baseball as a teenage sensation in 1967 for the St. Petersburg Cardinals of the Class A Florida State League. He compiled a 16–3 won–loss record, an earned run average of 1.74, and led the FSL with seven shutouts. The following year, he tied for the lead in games won (13) in the Double-A Texas League. Called up to the Cardinals near the end of the 1969 season, he made his debut September 30 as the starting pitcher in a 4–3 loss to the Philadelphia Phillies. Guzmán lasted  innings and struck out seven, but surrendered all four earned runs and nine hits, including home runs to Johnny Briggs and Tony Taylor.

In 1970, he made the Cardinals out of spring training and appeared in seven early-season games. On May 19 he received his second MLB starting assignment, and pitched a complete game, five-hit, 12–3 victory over the Houston Astros for his only Major League victory. He spent the bulk of that season with the Cardinals' Tulsa Oilers Triple-A farm club, then hurled one more game for the Redbirds in September. His 1971 and 1972 seasons were almost exclusively spent in minor league baseball, as Guzmán appeared in two MLB games in 1971 and one in 1972.

He retired after the 1973 season. All told, Santiago Guzmán allowed 30 hits and 18 bases on balls in 32 innings of work with the Cardinals. He struck out 29.

References

External links

1949 births
Living people
Appleton Foxes players
Arkansas Travelers players
Dominican Republic expatriate baseball players in the United States

Major League Baseball players from the Dominican Republic
Major League Baseball pitchers
Sportspeople from San Pedro de Macorís
St. Louis Cardinals players
St. Petersburg Cardinals players
Tucson Toros players
Tulsa Oilers (baseball) players
Cafeteros de Córdoba players
Dominican Republic expatriate baseball players in Mexico